Ian Clifford Henry (23 October 1914 – 20 December 1999) was an English cricketer. Henry was a right-handed batsman who bowled leg break. He was born at Kensington, London, and was educated at Uppingham School.

Henry made a single first-class appearance for the Free Foresters against Oxford University at University Parks in 1937. In a match which Oxford University won by ten wickets, Henry top-scored with 80 in the Free Foresters first-innings, before he was dismissed by David Macindoe, while in their second-innings he was dismissed for 4 runs by Barrington Hill. This was his only first-class appearance.

He died at Drayton Beauchamp, Buckinghamshire on 20 December 1999.

References

External links

1914 births
1999 deaths
Sportspeople from Kensington
People educated at Uppingham School
English cricketers
Free Foresters cricketers